The Lawson Boom was the macroeconomic conditions prevailing in the United Kingdom at the end of the 1980s, which became associated with the policies of Margaret Thatcher's Chancellor of the Exchequer, Nigel Lawson.

The term Lawson Boom was used by analogy with the phrase "The Barber Boom", an earlier period of rapid expansion under the tenure as chancellor of Anthony Barber in the Conservative government of Edward Heath. In his 1987 and 1988  budgets, Lawson cut standard rate income tax from 29p to 25p and cut the top rate to 40p. He did this because he believed that the economy was slowing down to a more sustainable rate, and "projected a huge surplus that justified his income tax cuts". In reality, the economy was accelerating out of control, inflation began shooting up, and the interest rate cuts had caused a 20% increase in house prices. Just a few months later he had to double interest rates, the UK was running its largest ever balance-of-payments deficit, and inflation began shooting up.

Critics of Lawson assert that a combination of the abandonment of monetarism, the adoption of a de facto exchange-rate target of 3 deutschmarks to the pound, and excessive fiscal laxity (in particular the 1988 budget) unleashed an inflationary spiral.

The economic boom saw strong economic growth during the second half of the 1980s, sparking a sharp fall in unemployment, which was still in excess of 3 million at the end of 1986, but had fallen to 1.6 million (the lowest for some 10 years) by the end of 1989.

In 1990, Shadow Chancellor of the Exchequer John Smith referred to the period as the "Lawson boom" in a House of Commons debate, in which he said 

The "dash for growth" had failed to save the Conservative government from electoral defeat at the hands of Labour in the 1964 general election, and was followed by a difficult period for the economy (during which unemployment nearly doubled) in the second half of the 1960s. The "Barber Boom" a decade later had contributed to a recession and was a factor in the Conservatives losing to Labour again after the February 1974 general election and was a major contributing factor in the subsequent 1976 sterling crisis. 

The inflationary pressures of the Lawson Boom were one of the reasons given for the UK's entry into the European Exchange Rate Mechanism in October 1990, a move that was supposed to help restrain inflation (which had been approaching 10%) in the UK by "importing" the anti-inflationary credibility of the Bundesbank. However, the economy fell into its third recession in less than 20 years, with unemployment coming close to 3 million by the end of 1992, even though this time the Conservatives managed to gain re-election.

See also
Black Monday (1987)worldwide stock-market crash
Black Wednesday (1992 Sterling crisis)

References

Further reading
 Cobham, David. "The Lawson boom: excessive depreciation versus financial liberalisation." Financial History Review 4#1 (1997): 69–90. online
 Matthijs, Matthias M. Ideas and economic crises in Britain from Attlee to Blair (1945-2005) (Routledge, 2012).
  Oliver, Michael J. "The macroeconomic policies of Mr Lawson," Contemporary British History, 13:1, 166–182, DOI: 10.1080/13619469908581520 emphasizes his mistakes and failures

1980s economic history
1980s in the United Kingdom
Economic booms
Economic history of the United Kingdom
Inflation in the United Kingdom
Public economics